Haiku is a free and open-source operating system compatible with the now discontinued BeOS.

Haiku applications are usually available as HPKGs; however, unpackaged applications can be installed by using Haiku PackageInstaller for legacy BeOS apps or manually unzipping the install files into one of the non-packaged installation folders. Haiku comes with a set of mostly small yet essential applications. Core applications are an essential part of Haiku, as they serve many different purposes. Haiku also has some 3rd party applications to supplement the core applications. The applications are usually executed by double clicking on the icon.

Core Applications

ActivityMonitor 
ActivityMonitor is a system monitor, making it possible for users to analyse the performance and function of their hardware. They can view components such as the memory being used, cached memory, and CPU usage. ActivityMonitor presents the information in graph form, which makes it easy for the users to understand their computer performance.

CharacterMap 
Haiku CharacterMap is a Character Map utility that shows the UTF-8 Code of every character a font supports. The font size can be changed and the user can drag any character into the StyledEdit application or the character can be copied and pasted where needed.

CodyCam 
CodyCam is a photo and video capture program that makes it possible for the user to take pictures at a specified interval from a connected webcam or any other video-in device and upload it via FTP. Users can specify the file's name; the image and video format; the capture interval and the network details for uploading to a FTP server.

DeskCalc 
DeskCalc is a simple Calculator that can perform different tasks related to mathematics. It has a simple interface and on the front screen it has some functions or buttons which can perform addition, subtraction, multiplication and division but it is not restricted to these only. DeskCalc can also perform tasks related to trigonometry. The type of the calculator can also be changed into scientific, radical or any other type to use it for different purposes.

DiskProbe 
DiskProbe is a Hex editor to view and alter data of a file or on a device on a byte-level. It is a very low-level tool which means that only the ones who are familiar with such language can use them and one wrong command can change the whole nature of the program so developers have to be careful when using this. At the start, a file has to be chosen by the user to edit it further in the application. The main view shows a block of data and its size can be changed and offset can be set as well.

DiskUsage 
DiskUsage is a Disk space analyser application that provides graphical information to the user showing the disk space being consumed. 'Scan' button has to be clicked once the user executes the application in order to start the scanning process. The application provides a pie chart showing the volume of space being used. Users can understand the graph and can utilise that data in many different ways. Every segment of the circle represents a folder and when the cursor is taken above one of them, its information comes on the status bar. The user can choose to re-scan the folder if they want to. They can also open it with another application or can fetch further information about the memory consumed.

DriveSetup 
DriveSetup is a harddisk partitioning tool that allows the user to create, delete and initialise partitions. It gives a graphical representation of all partitions on devices which are chosen in the device list below the graph. The maximum number of primary partitions which may be extended or can be logical partitions is limited to four. Partitions can be mounted or unmounted by using some commands after choosing a partition from the list.

Expander 
Expander is the default file archive handler for Haiku and is used to quickly unpack the most common archives, among them zip, gzip, bzip2, rar and tar.gz, provided the appropriate command-line utility is installed (zip and gzip are natively supported by the distribution). When a compressed archive file is chosen by the user that they wish to expand and uncompress, they can then choose the destination folder for the expansion; which is where the expanded files will be stored.

HaikuDepot 

HaikuDepot is the native package manager for the Haiku operating system which was integrated into Haiku after its R1A4 release. Most applications on Haiku now run from their packages but are virtualised as virtual directories on the Be File System.

Installer 
Installer is a System Installer tool that is used to install Haiku to a partition. It makes it possible for the user to copy Haiku onto another volume. The installer needs a prepared partition. Haiku can also be added manually but using Installer is preferred over that because adding it manually is harder than using the installer. The user has to choose the source of the software which may be any CD or USB and has to choose the target destination. 'Begin' has to be clicked in order to start the installation process.

Magnify 
Magnify is a Screen magnifier application that allows the user to magnify particular content or the whole display. Magnify lets the user to zoom in and magnify the content near the cursor. Tasks such as saving the image, increasing the pixels, copying the image and many other tasks can be done by the user.

MidiPlayer 
MidiPlayer is an application that plays back MIDI audio files.

PackageInstaller 

PackageInstaller is a software installer for BeOS packages in PKG format. It provides a GUI that helps in package installation in Haiku. Installation type or the destination may be chosen here by the user. The application shows the progress of the installation while the installation takes place.

PoorMan 

PoorMan is a simple personal web server bundled with the Haiku operating system.

Screenshot 
Screenshot is an application for capturing screenshots of the screen. Although this can be done manually by pressing  (the Print Screen key), by using the screenshot application the user can take advantage of other features that are unavailable when only using the  key method. With the application the user may choose to capture only the active window or windows, to exclude the yellow tab bar and border or to choose to include the mouse pointer as well. With the application the user can also rename the files, can set up a delay or interval, can change the save destination etc.

SoundRecorder 
SoundRecorder is a tool used to record audio from some input device such as the microphone. The user may start, pause or stop the recording at any time he wants with the buttons assigned to these tasks. Volume can be increased or decreased too.

StyledEdit 
StyledEdit is a basic text editor. However, it is able to use Haiku's extended attributes to create elementary word processor functions such as the use of different typefaces, and styles such as bold and italic. The resulting file, when loaded into a text editor that is unaware of extended attributes, is presented b y the other editor as a simple text file.

Terminal 
Haiku Terminal is a Terminal emulator that is Haiku's interface to bash, the Bourne Again Shell.  Bash is a Unix shell written by Brian Fox for the GNU Project as a free software replacement for the Bourne shell. The user can open as many terminals as the user wants to on different tabs or windows. There are different commands which can be used while using Terminal and they can be used to change the settings, to customize the bash or the profile etc. The color of the prompt changes depending on whether the previously executed program ended successfully or not.

TextSearch 
TextSearch makes it possible for the user to search for some characters, letters, words or even sentences in any text file. They can choose the type of files in the settings menu as well. It looks for a string in text files, which can be copied, deleted, edited by the user or they may perform some other tasks related to the text. They can also view the history of their searches and can view encoding menu to choose different characters.

Tracker 

Tracker is a graphical user interface based file manager for managing fileswith Haiku. It is somewhat similar to Finder on Mac OS 9 and Mac OS X. The Haiku version of Tracker is based on OpenTracker which in turn is an open sourced version of the Tracker found in the BeOS.

TV 
TV is a viewer for Analog TV. It is used to view different channels on Haiku. It is not a web-streaming app and requires a TV Card to start using it. Once the setup is completed, the user may set different frequencies or view different channels.

Vision

An IRC (Internet Relay Chat) client for Haiku.

WebPositive 

WebPositive (also called Web+) is the graphical web browser included with Haiku since version R1A2. It uses WebKit as its browser engine.

3rd Party 

The following 3rd party programs are bundled with Haiku. Many more can, however, be installed using the HaikuDepot application.

BePDF 

BePDF is a PDF viewer.

Pe 

Pe is an advanced text editor, intended mainly for programming and development purposes. Unlike StyledEdit, it does not work with Haiku's extended attributes.

Wonderbrush 
Wonderbrush is a bitmap graphics editor.

References 

Haiku